Franciszek Henryk Siła-Nowicki (29 January 1864, in Kraków, Austrian Empire – 3 September 1935, in Zawoja, Poland) was a Young Poland poet, a mountaineer, socialist activist, and designer of the Orla Perć (Eagle's Path) High Tatras mountain trail.

Life

Franciszek Nowicki was the son of Maksymilian Nowicki — a zoologist and pioneer Polish conservationist — and Antonina Kasparek, sister of Franciszek Kasparek, professor of international law, rector of Kraków University, and founder of the first chair in international law in Poland.

As a university student, Nowicki co-edited (with Kazimierz Tetmajer, Andrzej Niemojewski, Artur Górski and others) a socialist-leaning journal, Ognisko (Focus).  Some years later, he co-founded the Polish Socialist-Democratic Party (Polska Partia Socjalistyczno-Demokratyczna).  From 1894 he taught at a secondary school (gimnazjum).

On February 5, 1901, Nowicki proposed to Towarzystwo Tatrzańskie (the Tatras Society)  the building of Orla Perć (the Eagle's Trail), which was partly realized in 1903-07.  In 1902 he climbed to the then-as-yet-unnamed Przełęcz Nowickiego (Nowicki's Pass) in the Buczynowe Turnie Tatras peaks.

In 1924 Nowicki retired from teaching, and in 1934 he became an honorary member of the Polish Writers' Union (Związek Zawodowy Literatów Polskich).

Writings
Nowicki published poems and stories and, in 1891, his sole little volume of Poems (Poezje), comprising two parts:  "The Tatras" ("Tatry") and "Songs of Time" ("Pieśni czasu").  He also translated from German, e.g., Goethe's idyll of Hermann and Dorothea.  He ceased writing poetry following an unhappy romantic involvement.

See also
 List of Polish-language poets
 Young Poland
 List of Poles

References
 Mała encyklopedia powszechna PWN (Small PWN Universal Encyclopedia), Warsaw, Państwowe Wydawnictwo Naukowe, 1959, p. 633.

External links
"Poeta Tatr" ("Poet of the Tatras"), an article about Franciszek Nowicki in the magazine, Pod Diablakiem.

1864 births
1935 deaths
Polish poets
Polish socialists
Polish translators
German–Polish translators
Polish male poets
Polish mountain climbers
Writers from Kraków
Translators of Johann Wolfgang von Goethe